This is a List of aviation companies of the United States Army from the United States Army Aviation Branch.

Numbered companies

Non-numbered companies

See also

 List of United States Army aircraft battalions

References

Citations

Bibliography